Galaxy X is a postulated dark satellite dwarf galaxy of the Milky Way Galaxy. If it exists, it would be composed mostly of dark matter and interstellar gas with few stars. Galactic coordinates would be (l=
-27.4°,b=-1.08°).

Discovery
Observational evidence for this galaxy was presented in 2015, based on the claimed discovery of four Cepheid variable stars by Sukanya Chakrabarti (RIT) and collaborators. Search for the stars was motivated by an earlier study  that linked a warp in the HI (atomic hydrogen) disk of the Milky Way Galaxy to the tidal effects of a perturbing galaxy. The unseen perturber's mass was calculated to be about 1% of that of the Milky Way, which would make it the third heaviest satellite of the Milky Way, after the Magellanic Clouds (Large Magellanic Cloud and Small Magellanic Cloud, each some 10x larger than Galaxy X).

Name
The name "Galaxy X" was coined in 2011 in analogy to Planet X.

Controversy
In November 2015, a group led by P. Pietrukowicz published a paper arguing against the existence of Galaxy X. These authors argued that the four stars were not actually Cepheid variable stars and that their distances might be very different than claimed in the discovery paper of Chakrabarti et al. On this basis, the authors stated that "there is no evidence for a background dwarf galaxy". However the galaxy is still regarded to exist by others, with the stars being examined to be actual Cepheids.

List of components
List of claimed components of Galaxy X

Footnotes

References

Further reading
 "Tidal Imprints Of A Dark Sub-Halo On The Outskirts Of The Milky Way" ; Sukanya Chakrabarti, Leo Blitz ; August 2009 ; Monthly Notices of the Royal Astronomical Society: Letters, Volume 399, Issue 1, pp. L118–L122 ;  ;  ;  ; 
 "Tidal Imprints of a Dark Sub-Halo on the Outskirts of the Milky Way II. Perturber Azimuth" ; Sukanya Chakrabarti, Leo Blitz ; July 2010 ; The Astrophysical Journal, Volume 731, Issue 1, article id. 40, 9 pp. (2011) ;  ;  ;  ; 
 "Clustered Cepheid Variables 90 kiloparsec from the Galactic Center" ; Sukanya Chakrabarti, Roberto Saito, Alice Quillen, Felipe Gran, Christopher Klein, Leo Blitz ; February 2015 ;  ;  ; Astrophysical Journal Letters
 Caroline Huang, Looking for Dwarf Galaxies: A Cautionary Tale, November 16, 2015.

Milky Way Subgroup
Dark galaxies
Hypothetical galaxies